Six ships of the French Navy have borne the name Sceptre after the sceptre, a symbol of royal or imperial authority.

 , an 80-gun (later 84-gun) ship of the line
 , an 84-gun ship of the line, lead ship of her class
 , a 74-gun ship of the line, never commissioned
 , a  74-gun ship of the line
 , a 74-gun ship of the line
 , a  80-gun ship of the line

See also 
 

French Navy ship names